Ruvolo is an Italian surname. Notable people with the surname include:

Felix Ruvolo (1912–1992), American painter
Giovanni Ruvolo (born 1966), Italian biologist and politician
Peter H. Ruvolo (1895–1943), American lawyer and politician 

Italian-language surnames